Vicki Worrall Bourne (born 22 October 1954) is a former Australian Democrats Senator for New South Wales from 1990 to 2002.

Bourne was born in Sydney; she attended the selective High School Fort Street, and then UNSW where she obtained a BSc and MSc. She was employed as a research officer for Democrats Senator Colin Mason in 1978; in 1980 she joined the party.  Following Mason's resignation she was a research officer for Senator Paul McLean.

Bourne was elected to the Senate in the 1990 Australian federal election; her term began on 1 July 1990. She was elected for a second term in the 1996 Australian federal election.  After she was defeated by Australian Greens candidate Kerry Nettle in the 2001 Australian federal election, her term ended on 30 June 2002.

References

1954 births
Living people
Australian Democrats members of the Parliament of Australia
Members of the Australian Senate
Members of the Australian Senate for New South Wales
University of New South Wales alumni
Women members of the Australian Senate
People educated at Fort Street High School
21st-century Australian politicians
21st-century Australian women politicians
20th-century Australian politicians
20th-century Australian women politicians